Deh-e Aqa (also Romanized as Deh-e Āqā and Deh Āqā; also known as Deh Sa‘īd) is a village in Shahsavan Kandi Rural District, in the Central District of Saveh County, Markazi Province, Iran. At the 2006 census, its population was 28, in 14 families.

References 

Populated places in Saveh County